Strongylognathus alboini is a species of ant in the genus Strongylognathus. It is native to Italy.

References

Strongylognathus
Hymenoptera of Europe
Insects described in 1924
Taxonomy articles created by Polbot